Mohamad Ali Vaez (born April 5, 1979), is an American professional wrestler, who is best known for his time spent in Ohio Valley Wrestling and Global Force Wrestling.

Professional wrestling career

Global Force Wrestling (2015)
On July 24, 2015, Vaez made his Global Force Wrestling (GFW) debut under the ring name Ali Akbar as part of the GFW Tag Team Championship Tournament during the GFW Amped tapings as part of the tag team The Akbars with Omar Akbar losing to The Bollywood Boyz in the quarterfinals.

On August 14, 2015, Akbar teamed with Cliff Compton and Jason Kincaid in a losing effort against Brad Attitude, Peter Kaasa and Vordell Walker during the GFW Grand Slam Tour in Winston-Salem, North Carolina.

On August 21, 2015, The Akbars teamed with P. J. Black during the GFW Amped tapings defeating the team of Sonjay Dutt and Los Luchas (Phoenix Star and Zokre)

On August 28 and 29, 2015 during the GFW Grand Slam Tour in Harrisburg, Pennsylvania and Richmond, Virginia, Akbar teamed with Seiya Sanada in two on one handicap matches against Doc Gallows in a losing effort on both nights.

Championships and accomplishments 
 American Wrestling Association Supreme
 AWA Supreme Mid-America Championship (1 time)

 Australian Wrestling Entertainment
 AWE Championship (1 time)

 Derby City Wrestling
 DCW Tag Team Championship (1 time) – with Omar Akbar
DCW Tag Team Championship Tournament (2007) – with Omar Akbar

 NWA Southern All-Star Wrestling
 NWA Southern Tag Team Championship (1 time) – with Mustafa Akbar

 Ohio Valley Wrestling
 OVW Heavyweight Championship (1 time)
 OVW Television Championship (8 time)
 OVW Southern Tag Team Championship (3 time) – with Omar Akbar (1) and Michael Hayes (2)
Fourteenth OVW Triple Crown Champion

 Outback Championship Wrestling
 OCW Heavyweight Championship (1 time)

 Warzone Wrestling Australia
 WWA Heavyweight Championship (2 time)
 WWA Tag Team Championship (1 time) – with Tyson Gibbs

 United Pro Wrestling
 UPW Heavyweight Championship (1 time)

References

External links
The Akbars – GFW Profile
 
 

1979 births
Living people
People from Richmond, Kentucky
Sportspeople from Kentucky
American male professional wrestlers
Professional wrestlers from Kentucky
American emigrants to Australia
Expatriate professional wrestlers
21st-century professional wrestlers
OVW Heavyweight Champions